Qanat Sorkh may refer to:
 Qanat Sorkh, Fars
 Qanat Sorkh, Kerman